Josef Marquard Wintrich (15 February 1891 – 19 October  1958) was a German legal scholar and judge. From 1910 to 1915 he studied legal science in Munich. He served as the 2nd president of the Federal Constitutional Court of Germany from 1954 to 1956. The most significant decision during his tenure was the banning of the Communist Party of Germany in 1956.

1891 births
1958 deaths
Jurists from Bavaria
Justices of the Federal Constitutional Court